Paola Valentina Pérez Sierra (born 5 April 1991) is a Venezuelan swimmer. She competed in the women's marathon 10 kilometre event at the 2016 Summer Olympics.

In 2019, she competed in the women's 5 km and women's 10 km events at the 2019 World Aquatics Championships held in Gwangju, South Korea. In the 5 km event she finished in 39th place and in the 10 km event she finished in 42nd place. In the same year, she also competed in the women's marathon 10 kilometres at the 2019 Pan American Games held in Lima, Peru. She finished in 11th place.

Notes

References

External links
 

1991 births
Living people
Venezuelan female swimmers
Female long-distance swimmers
Olympic swimmers of Venezuela
Swimmers at the 2016 Summer Olympics
People from San Cristóbal, Táchira
Pan American Games silver medalists for Venezuela
Pan American Games medalists in swimming
Swimmers at the 2015 Pan American Games
Swimmers at the 2019 Pan American Games
Medalists at the 2015 Pan American Games
21st-century Venezuelan women